, born 22 February 1954 in Tokyo, is a musician best known for his work with the Japanese glam rock band Vodka Collins. Take (pronounced Ta-kay, real name Takehiro) was originally a live touring guitar player for the popular teen idol band The Four Leaves.When he was approached to join the new band Vodka Collins in 1971, it was on bass guitar, and a job he took gladly.  Take Yokouchi played bass on the 1973 Vodka Collins singles "Sands Of Time" and "Automatic Pilot", and the "Tokyo - New York" album released on EMI-Toshiba in 1973.

Late career
After Vodka Collins broke up in 1974, Take Yokouchi went back to playing guitar, ultimately forming the band Tensaw, who would re-record the Vodka Collins song "Automatic Pilot" in the 1980s, and the band would have a chart hit with it. For reasons unknown, Take Yokouchi did not take part in the later Vodka Collins reunion albums in the 1990s, being replaced by Masayoshi "Mabo" Kabe, of The Golden Cups.

External links
 Author Julian Cope's Vodka Collins research

Japanese musicians
Living people
Year of birth missing (living people)